The Metropolitan of Fortaleza, also known popularly as Metro of Fortaleza or Metrofor, is a system of metropolitan transport that operates in the Brazilian city of Fortaleza, operated by Companhia Cearense de Transportes Metropolitanos, company of social capital, captained by the Government of the State of Ceará, in Brazil, and has as current president Eduardo Hotz. Founded on May 2, 1997, the company is responsible for administration, construction and metro planning in the state of Ceará, being present in the systems of Sobral and Cariri, having its main activity in Fortaleza and its metropolitan region.

According to data released in December 2016, the system is the sixth largest in Brazil among the 12 Brazilian metropolitan regions that have passenger rail transport, having in the period , behind São Paulo (334.9 km), Rio de Janeiro (262.1 km), Recife (71.4 km), Natal (56.2 km) and Porto Alegre (43.9 km). The FMR lines represent 4.3% of the total network of subways and trains of Brazil that, in 2015, was of 1,062 km of extension. The Metro was used by 13.2 million passengers in 2018.

The Fortaleza Metro started its operations on June 15, 2012, in assisted operation. With the start of commercial operation on October 1, 2014, a R$2.40 fare started being charged, which gradually increased to R$3.60 as of April 2021. There is fare integration with the Integrated Transport System of Fortaleza (SIT-FOR). Currently in operation are 20 stations on the South Line, 10 stations of West Line light rail (in the future to be converted into a metro system), and 10 stations on the Parangaba-Mucuripe light rail, operating in assisted operation with passenger transportation in the period from 6 am until noon without charge for tickets. Possessing a projected extension of 69.4 kilometers distributed in 4 lines, connected by 52 stations, mostly under construction or in design on the East Line (Tirol-Moura Brasil ↔ Edson Queiroz). The system was designed to integrate with two of the city's seven bus terminals, Parangaba and Papicu, and to connect to the passenger terminals at Mucuripe Port and Fortaleza International Airport.

Background 
The operator of the Fortaleza Metro, Metrofor, has been in the process of modernizing Fortaleza's rail network since 1999, with plans for improving the network going back to the 1980s. The project involved double tracking and electrification of two of the main passenger rail lines, installation of modern signalling and communications system, construction of new stations, and acquisition of new rolling stock, all with the goal of achieving higher frequency operations on the two lines. The upgraded rail network is expected to serve nearly 700,000 passengers a day.

Operations 

Lines

Routes  
The Linha Sul (South Line) is the first of the two lines to be converted to higher frequency service, with headways of 27 minutes.

It begins at Caucaia and currently terminates at João Felipe, with plans to extend it to Central – Chico da Silva. It currently operates with train frequencies of 45 minutes.

Stations 

Stations on the metro-standards South Line, from south to north:
Carlito Benevides (formerly Vila das Flores)
Jereissati
Maracanaú
Virgílio Távora (formerly Novo Maracanaú)
Rachel de Queiroz (formerly Pajuçara)
Alto Alegre
Aracapé
Esperança (formerly Conjunto Esperança)
Mondubim
Manoel Sátiro
Vila Pery
Parangaba
Juscelino Kubitschek
Couto Fernandes
Padre Cícero 
Porangabussu
Benfica
São Benedito
José de Alencar (formerly Lagoinha)
Estação Central – Chico da Silva (formerly João Felipe)

Rolling stock 

The AnsaldoBreda rolling stock used on the system is similar to that used on the Circumvesuviana railway, in Naples, Italy. A total of 20 train-sets were expected to be delivered, and in service, by 2012.

Light rail 
A third rail line in the Fortaleza area, which runs between Parangaba and Macuripe and which had operated as a cargo line, was converted into a diesel light rail line. The line partly opened in July 2017, was extended in July 2018, and was then extended to its current 10-station length with the opening of Iate station in September 2020.

Future plans: East Line 
A new totally underground line, the East (Leste) line, was expected to begin construction in 2018, with the contract for its constructions awarded to Sacyr and Ferrera Guedes, with an estimated construction time of 48 months. Tunnel boring machines for the construction were announced to be provided by The Robbins Company in 2012, but construction stalled. Current plans are to complete this third metro line as follows:

See also 
 List of suburban and commuter rail systems
 Rapid transit in Brazil

References

External links 

  

Metro
Transport in Ceará
Metre gauge railways in Brazil
Railway lines opened in 2012